Freddi Poole; sometimes billed as Freddie Pool (born September 12, 1946), is an American singer, known best for her work with the Former Ladies of the Supremes and The Three Degrees.

Biography
Raised in Los Angeles, she started her singing career in the church at the age of four, and got her first recording contract at the age of fourteen with the girl group "The Delicates". The quartet recorded several singles for the Challenge, Soultown, and Pulsar Record labels. Pool went on to become a founding member of the female trio: Wild Honey. R&B star Vesta Williams, and Mary Flowers were her groupmates. Ron Townson (of The 5th Dimension) was their mentor. The group disbanded in the early 1980s. Freddi's impressive list of musical associations include performances with Lola Falana, former Supreme Jean Terrell, Lisa Stansfield, Phyllis Hyman, Patti LaBelle, Ron Townson, and Sammy Davis, Jr. Her television appearances include The Tonight Show, The Merv Griffin Show, and The Arsenio Hall Show. Freddi has also recorded and performed with Liza Minnelli, Lou Rawls and Jermaine Jackson. She managed her own 12-piece band "The Motorcity Angels" and prior to joining Scherrie Payne and Lynda Laurence's group, Freddi was touring extensively with the legendary Motown songstress Gladys Knight.

Former Ladies of the Supremes
In July 1996, Freddi replaced Sundray Tucker in the Former Ladies of the Supremes. In September 2009, it was reported via Scherrie Payne and Lynda Laurence's website that Freddi would be no longer a part of "The Ladies", instead, Joyce Vincent, formerly of Tony Orlando and Dawn, had taken her place.

The Three Degrees
In January 2011, Poole replaced Cynthia Garrison in The Three Degrees, who was suffering from Piriformis syndrome and could no longer tour with the group. , Poole was still a member of the Three Degrees.

Discography

Freddie Pool - Driving Wheel Records
The Utrecht Sessions - CD EP - Released March 2014
Young Hearts Run Free (Radio Mix) - Digital Download Single - Released August 2014
Young Hearts Run Free (The Remixes) - Digital Download Single - Released March 2015
I Will Survive - Digital Download Single - Released June 2015
I Will Survive (Berlin Remixes) - Digital Download Single/Maxi CD - Released January 2017
Young Hearts Run Free (Rinaldo Montezz Remix) - Digital Download Single - Released November 2018
I Will Survive (Rinaldo Montezz Freddie Goes To Rio Remix) - Digital Download Single - Released February 2020

References

External links
Freddie Pool FanSite (official fansite)
The Three Degrees (official website)
Driving Wheel Records

20th-century African-American women singers
American women singers
Living people
1946 births
21st-century African-American people
21st-century African-American women